Jandira Lúcia Lalia Martini (born June 10, 1945, in Santos, São Paulo) is a Brazilian actress and author of theatre and screenplays.

Filmography

Television 
 1983 - Braço de Ferro
 1987 - Sassaricando - Teodora Abdalla
 1990 - A História de Ana Raio e Zé Trovão - Vitória Imperial
 1991 - O Fantasma da Ópera - Marion Leik Fitzgerald
 1994 - Éramos Seis - Dona Genu
 1995 - Sangue do Meu Sangue - Rebeca
 1996 - Brava Gente - Augusta Messinari
 2001 - Os Maias - Eugênia Silveira
 2001 - O Clone - Zoraide
 2003 - A Casa das Sete Mulheres - Dona Antônia
 2004 - A Diarista - Dilma (episode: Aquele com os Loucos)
 2005 - América - Odaléia de Oliveira
 2007 - Amazônia, de Galvez a Chico Mendes - Donana
 2007 - Desejo Proibido - Dona Guará
 2009 - Caminho das Índias - Puja
 2010 - Escrito nas Estrelas - Gildete (Madame Gilda)
 2011 - Morde & Assopra - Salomé de Souza
 2012 - Salve Jorge - Farid

Film 
 1990 - Uma Escola Atrapalhada - Dona Alma
 2004 - Olga - Sara

References

External links 

Brazilian stage actresses
Brazilian television actresses
Brazilian telenovela actresses
Brazilian film actresses
1945 births
Living people
People from Santos, São Paulo
Brazilian people of Italian descent